Aclytia leucaspila is a moth of the family Erebidae. It was described by Henry Fleming in 1959. It is found in Trinidad.

References

Moths described in 1959
Aclytia
Moths of the Caribbean